Krista Fanedl (born 1 August 1941) is a Slovenian alpine skier. She competed in three events at the 1964 Winter Olympics, representing Yugoslavia.

References

1941 births
Living people
Slovenian female alpine skiers
Olympic alpine skiers of Yugoslavia
Alpine skiers at the 1964 Winter Olympics
Sportspeople from Maribor